The Roman Catholic Diocese of Sipingjie/Siping/Szepíngkai is a Latin suffragan diocese in the Ecclesiastical province of the Metropolitan of Shenyang.

Its episcopal seat is at Sacred Heart Cathedral located in the city of Sipingjie (Siping, Jiling or Szepíngkai) in Jilin province.

History 
 Established on August 2, 1929 as the Apostolic Prefecture of Szepingkai, on territories split off from the then Apostolic Vicariate of Shenyang and the Apostolic Vicariate of Rehe
 June 1, 1932: Promoted as Apostolic Vicariate of Szepingkai
 Lost territory on 18 May 1937 to establish the Apostolic Prefecture of Lindong
 April 11, 1946: Promoted and renamed as Diocese of Siping(jie) alias Szepíngkai, ending its missionary, pre-diocesan and exempt status

Ordinaries 
(all Roman rite, mostly missionary members of a Latin congregation) Apostolic Prefects of Szepingkai Fr. Joseph Louis Adhémar Lapierre, Société des Missions-Étrangères du Québec (Society of Foreign Missions; P.M.E.) (February 19, 1930–May 24, 1932 see below)

 Apostolic Vicar of Szepingkai Joseph Louis Adhémar Lapierre, P.M.E. (see above May 24, 1932–April 11, 1946 see below), Titular Bishop of Cardicium (1932.05.24–1946.04.11)

 Suffragan Bishops of Sipingjie Joseph Louis Adhémar Lapierre, P.M.E. (see above April 11, 1946–death December 1, 1952)
 Apostolic Administrator (1954.04.02–2004) Paul Zhang
 Andrew Han Jingtao (1982–2020.12.30)

Sources and external links

 GCatholic.org
 Catholic Hierarchy

Roman Catholic dioceses in China
Christian organizations established in 1929
Roman Catholic dioceses and prelatures established in the 20th century
Organizations based in Jilin